Chandipur High School is a public educational institution located at Chandipur village of Dhamoirhat Upazila based in  Naogaon District, Bangladesh. It was established in 1969 and currently serves more than 300 students. It is situated at the northern part of Dhamoirhat Upazila.

It is a two-storied building which is used for administrative and academic purposes. It includes a library with more than 1000 books.

Chandipur Government Primary School is also located in front of Chandipur High School, after established in 1930, it was nationalized in 1991 by Bangladesh Government.

References

High schools in Bangladesh
Educational institutions established in 1969
1969 establishments in East Pakistan
Schools in Naogaon District